Brian Ezequiel Orosco (born 28 February 1998) is an Argentine professional footballer who plays as a midfielder for Argentine club Estudiantes de La Plata.

Career
CAI gave Orosco his start in senior football. A 2–0 defeat to Cipolletti on 21 June 2015 saw Orosco make his senior bow in Torneo Federal A, coming on as a substitute in place of Matías Vargas in the first of six appearances in the 2015 campaign. That ended with relegation to Torneo Federal B, tier four, where he would score five goals in thirty matches across three years. June 2018 saw Primera B Nacional's Guillermo Brown sign Orosco. He made his debut in the Copa Argentina on 20 July during a narrow loss to Tigre of the Primera División. Orosco left Guillermo Brown in January 2019, subsequently moving back to tier four CAI.

On 18 July 2019, Orosco returned to Primera B Nacional after agreeing a move to Villa Dálmine.

Almost a year later, in June 2020, it was widely reported that Orosco was close to joining Super League Greece side Asteras Tripolis.

In the 2021 season he played for Deportivo Morón.

In February 2022 he signed for Estudiantes de La Plata.

Career statistics
.

References

External links

1998 births
Living people
Sportspeople from Mendoza, Argentina
Argentine footballers
Association football midfielders
Argentine expatriate footballers
Argentine Primera División players
Torneo Federal A players
Primera Nacional players
Comisión de Actividades Infantiles footballers
Guillermo Brown footballers
Villa Dálmine footballers
Asteras Tripolis F.C. players
Estudiantes de La Plata footballers
Expatriate footballers in Greece
Argentine expatriate sportspeople in Greece